The End... is the fourth studio album by German musician Nico. It was recorded in summer 1974 at Sound Techniques studio in London and produced by John Cale. It was released in November 1974, on record label Island.

Background 

Nico had performed two songs from the album a few years prior to the album release; "Secret Side" had been performed at a John Peel session for the BBC on 2nd February 1971 and she had also performed "You Forget to Answer" on TV in France and the Netherlands in early 1972.

Recording 

The End... is her fifth collaboration with John Cale and second with him as producer. It carries the same harmonium-based sound heard on The Marble Index (1968) and Desertshore (1970), with the addition of Brian Eno's synthesizers and electronic instruments.

The song "You Forget to Answer" tells of the misery felt by Nico when she failed to reach ex-lover, and Doors' singer, Jim Morrison by phone only to find out later that he had died. The album was her first since Morrison's death in 1971. All but two of the songs on the album were written by Nico: the cover of the Doors' "The End" and a version of the German national anthem "Das Lied der Deutschen". Brian Eno plays synthesizer on "It Has Not Taken Long", "You Forget to Answer" and "Innocent and Vain".

The front and back covers feature stills from the Philippe Garrel film Les hautes solitudes (1974) in which Nico appears with Jean Seberg.

Release and reception 

The End... was released in November 1974, on record label Island, her only album on the label. Despite strong reviews from some publications, like its predecessors, it was not a commercial success and Nico's partnership with Island ended.

Reviewing in Christgau's Record Guide: Rock Albums of the Seventies (1981), Robert Christgau wrote (partly in a faux German accent): "I don't know vy she's moaning about unved virgins and vether to betray her hate, and I don't vant to know. The Manzanera-Eno-Cale settings, which I believe is what one calls this sort of elevated sound effect, are suitably morbid and exotic. But funereal irony aside, her parlay of the Doors' 'The End' and the Fuehrer's 'Das Lied Der Deutschens' contextualizes both tunes more pejoratively than is intended. Nico is what happens when the bloodless wager their minds on the wisdom of the blood and the suicidal make something of their lives. If this be romanticism, give me Matthew Arnold—and gimme shelter."

Track listing 

 Note: The original CD edition of the album erroneously cuts off the song 'You Forget to Answer' about ten seconds early. The deluxe 2 CD remastered edition corrects this error.

Personnel 

 Nico – lead vocals, harmonium
Additional personnel
 John Cale – bass guitar, xylophone, acoustic guitar, synthesizers, organ, marimba, triangles, cabaça, boobams, glockenspiel, percussion, piano, electric piano, production
 Phil Manzanera – electric guitar on "The End"
 Brian Eno – synthesizers on "It Has Not Taken Long", "You Forgot to Answer" and "Innocent and Vain"
 Vicki Wood – backing vocals
 Annagh Wood – backing vocals
Technical
 John Wood, Victor Gamm - studio engineer

References

External links 

 

1974 albums
Nico albums
Albums produced by John Cale
Island Records albums